"A Woman Loves" is a song written by Steve Bogard and Rick Giles, and recorded by American country music artist Steve Wariner.  It was released in May 1992 as the third single from the album I Am Ready.  The song reached #9 on the Billboard Hot Country Singles & Tracks chart.

Chart performance

Year-end charts

References

1992 singles
Steve Wariner songs
Song recordings produced by Scott Hendricks
Arista Nashville singles
Songs written by Steve Bogard
Songs written by Rick Giles
1991 songs